Antiques Roadshow is a long-running British television series about the appraisal of antiques, broadcast on BBC One since the show's launch on February 18, 1979. It is currently in its forty-fourth series, with over 850 episodes to date.

Broadcast history

Regular series

Series 1 (1979)
Series 1: 8 editions from 18 February – 8 April 1979

Newbury (18 February 1979)
Bedworth (25 February 1979)
Yeovil (4 March 1979)
Northallerton (11 March 1979)
Mold (18 March 1979)
Buxton (25 March 1979)
Perth (1 April 1979)
Hereford (8 April 1979)

Series 2 (1980)
Series 2: 8 editions from 9 March – 27 April 1980

Ely (9 March 1980)
Llandrindod Wells (16 March 1980)
Trowbridge (23 March 1980)
Oldham (30 March 1980)
Maidstone (6 April 1980)
Camberley (13 April 1980)
Stoke-on-Trent (20 April 1980)
Guernsey (27 April 1980)

Series 3 (1981)
Series 3: 8 editions from 15 March – 3 May 1981

Cheltenham (15 March 1981)
Troon (22 March 1981)
Aberystwyth (29 March 1981)
Aylesbury (5 April 1981)
Salisbury (12 April 1981)
Monmouth (19 April 1981)
Derby (26 April 1981)
Bognor Regis (3 May 1981)

Series 4 (1982)
Series 4: 8 editions from 4 April – 23 May 1982

Winchester (4 April 1982)
Lancaster (11 April 1982)
St Austell (18 April 1982)
Leamington Spa (25 April 1982)
Bolton (2 May 1982)
Exeter (9 May 1982)
Scarborough (16 May 1982)
Malvern (23 May 1982)

Series 5 (1983)
Series 5: 8 editions from 3 April – 22 May 1983

Harrogate (3 April 1983)
Gloucester (10 April 1983)
Dundee (17 April 1983)
Leicester (24 April 1983)
Torquay (1 May 1983)
Norwich (8 May 1983)
Southport (15 May 1983)
Folkestone (22 May 1983)

Series 6 (1984)
Series 6: 7 editions from 8 April – 20 May 1984

Poole (8 April 1984)
Crewe (15 April 1984)
Reading (22 April 1984)
Aberdeen (29 April 1984)
Eastbourne (6 May 1984)
Blackburn (13 May 1984)
Jersey (20 May 1984)

Series 7 (1985)
Series 7: 8 editions from 31 March – 19 May 1985

Brangwyn Hall, Swansea (31 March 1985)
Kendal (7 April 1985)
Banbury (14 April 1985)
Plymouth (21 April 1985)
Nottingham (28 April 1985)
Sunderland (5 May 1985)
Guildhall, Portsmouth (12 May 1985)
Douglas, Isle of Man (19 May 1985)

Series 8 (1986)
Series 8: 10 editions from 16 March – 18 May 1986

Wolverhampton (16 March 1986)
Edinburgh (23 March 1986)
Corn Exchange, Ipswich (30 March 1986)
Llandudno (6 April 1986)
Bedford (13 April 1986)
Doncaster (20 April 1986)
Watford (27 April 1986)
Hull (4 May 1986)
Swindon (11 May 1986)
Southend-on-Sea (18 May 1986)

Series 9 (1987)
Series 9: 12 editions from 4 January – 22 March 1987

Barnstaple (4 January 1987)
Dunfermline (11 January 1987)
Southampton (18 January 1987)
Chester (25 January 1987)
Bath (1 February 1987)
Newcastle-upon-Tyne (8 February 1987)
Preston (15 February 1987)
Carlisle (22 February 1987)
Worthing (1 March 1987)
Peterborough (8 March 1987)
Camborne (15 March 1987)
Margate (22 March 1987)

Series 10 (1988)
Series 10: 12 editions from 3 January – 20 March 1988

Worcester (3 January 1988)
Great Yarmouth (10 January 1988)
Ventnor, Isle of Wight (17 January 1988)
Bradford (24 January 1988)
Cambridge (31 January 1988)
Glasgow (7 February 1988)
Cardiff (14 February 1988)
Chelmsford (21 February 1988)
Middlesbrough (28 February 1988)
Belfast (6 March 1988)
Maidenhead (13 March 1988)
Cutlers' Hall, Sheffield (20 March 1988)

Series 11 (1989)
Series 11: 12 editions from 1 January – 19 March 1989

Liverpool (1 January 1989)
Harrow (8 January 1989)
Birmingham (15 January 1989)
Bournemouth (22 January 1989)
Bristol (29 January 1989)
Dublin, Ireland (5 February 1989)
Guildford (12 February 1989)
Leeds (19 February 1989)
Newark (26 February 1989)
Hastings (5 March 1989)
Glenrothes, Fife (12 March 1989)
Tavistock (19 March 1989)

Series 12 (1989-90)
Series 12: 12 editions from 31 December 1989 – 18 March 1990

Lincoln (31 December 1989)
Tower Ballroom, Blackpool (7 January 1990)
Paignton (14 January 1990)
Elgin (21 January 1990)
Elsinore Castle, Denmark (28 January 1990)
Leominster (4 February 1990)
Manchester Town Hall (11 February 1990)
Royal Tunbridge Wells (18 February 1990)
Malmö, Sweden (25 February 1990)
Derngate Centre, Northampton (4 March 1990)
Hornchurch (11 March 1990)
Corn Exchange, Brighton (18 March 1990)

Series 13 (1990-91)
Series 13: 12 editions from 30 December 1990 – 17 March 1991

Islington (30 December 1990)
Darlington (6 January 1991)
Merthyr Tydfil (13 January 1991)
Stowmarket (20 January 1991)
Hexham (27 January 1991)
St. Ives (3 February 1991)
Ayr (10 February 1991)
Salisbury Cathedral (17 February 1991)
Valletta, Malta (24 February 1991)
Whitehaven (3 March 1991)
Stafford (10 March 1991)
Church of St George, Gillingham, Kent (17 March 1991)

Series 14 (1991-92)
Series 14: 12 editions from 29 December 1991 – 15 March 1992

Alexandra Palace (29 December 1991)
Queensferry (5 January 1992)
Cleethorpes (12 January 1992)
Farnham (19 January 1992)
Enniskillen (26 January 1992)
Chippenham (2 February 1992)
Civic Hall, Stratford-upon-Avon (9 February 1992)
Fleet Air Arm Museum, Yeovilton (16 February 1992)
York (23 February 1992)
Hemel Hempstead (1 March 1992)
Stromness Academy, Orkney (8 March 1992)
Rochdale (15 March 1992)

Series 15 (1992-93)
Series 15: 13 editions from 27 December 1992 – 21 March 1993

Special: The Next Generation; National Railway Museum, York (27 December 1992)
National Motor Museum, Beaulieu (3 January 1993)
Berwick-upon-Tweed (10 January 1993)
Kingsbridge (17 January 1993)
Chesterfield (24 January 1993)
Spalding (31 January 1993)
Arts Centre of Warwick University (7 February 1993)
Kingston, Jamaica (14 February 1993)
Macclesfield (21 February 1993)
Aberdeen (28 February 1993)
Royal Borough of Kensington and Chelsea (7 March 1993)
Pembroke (14 March 1993)
Arundel Castle, Sussex (21 March 1993)

Series 16 (1993-94)
Series 16: 15 editions from 26 December 1993 – 3 April 1994

Special: The Next Generation; Science Museum (26 December 1993)
Trentham Gardens, Stoke-on-Trent (2 January 1994)
Barrow-in-Furness (9 January 1994)
Exeter (16 January 1994)
Kidderminster (23 January 1994)
Beaumaris, Anglesey (30 January 1994)
Heveningham Hall, Suffolk (6 February 1994)
Cork, Ireland (13 February 1994)
Crawley (20 February 1994)
Motherwell (27 February 1994)
Olympia (6 March 1994)
Gibraltar (13 March 1994)
Ashford, Kent (20 March 1994)
King's Lynn (27 March 1994)
Raby Castle, County Durham (3 April 1994)

Series 17 (1995)
Series 17: 20 editions from 1 January – 14 May 1995

Special: The Next Generation; Sherlock Holmes Baker Street film set, Manchester (1 January 1995)
Truro Cathedral (8 January 1995)
Colchester (15 January 1995)
Wrekin College, Shropshire (22 January 1995)
Bridlington (29 January 1995)
De La Warr Pavilion, Bexhill-on-Sea (5 February 1995)
Assembly Rooms, Derby (12 February 1995)
Luton Hoo, Bedfordshire 1 (19 February 1995)
Luton Hoo, Bedfordshire 2 (26 February 1995)
Inverness (5 March 1995)
Basingstoke (12 March 1995)
St Peter Port, Guernsey (19 March 1995) 
Newcastle Emlyn, Dyfed (26 March 1995)
Huddersfield (2 April 1995)
Taunton (9 April 1995)
Brussels, Belgium (16 April 1995)
Accrington (23 April 1995)
Wymondham, Norfolk (30 April 1995)
Blenheim Palace, Oxfordshire 1 (7 May 1995)
Blenheim Palace, Oxfordshire 2 (14 May 1995)

Series 18 (1995-96)
Series 18: 20 editions from 24 December 1995 – 5 May 1996

Special: The Next Generation; Ulster Folk and Transport Museum (24 December 1995)
Ely Cathedral (31 December 1995)
Dover (7 January 1996)
Llangollen, Clwyd (14 January 1996)
Jersey (21 January 1996)
Stirling (28 January 1996)
Cheltenham (4 February 1996)
Alnwick Castle 1 (11 February 1996)
Alnwick Castle 2 (18 February 1996)
Weymouth (25 February 1996)
Mansfield (3 March 1996)
Peebles (10 March 1996) 
Henley (17 March 1996)
Windermere (24 March 1996)
Penarth, South Glamorgan (31 March 1996)
Fountains Abbey (7 April 1996)
Broxbourne (14 April 1996)
Apsley House (21 April 1996)
Amsterdam, Netherlands (28 April 1996)
Bishop's Palace, Wells, Somerset (5 May 1996)

Series 19 (1996-97)
Series 19: 26 editions from 27 October 1996 – 27 April 1997

Portsmouth Dockyard (27 October 1996)
Ludlow (3 November 1996)
Skye (10 November 1996)
Chepstow, Gwent (17 November 1996)
Market Harborough (24 November 1996)
Compilation: unseen bits/experts' favourites (1 December 1996)
Penzance Harbour, Isles of Scilly (8 December 1996)
Michelham Priory (15 December 1996)
Special: The Next Generation; Royal Museum of Scotland, Edinburgh (29 December 1996)
Christ's Hospital School, Horsham (5 January 1997)
Bebington (12 January 1997)
Lyme Regis (19 January 1997)
Waddesdon Manor, Buckinghamshire 1 (26 January 1997)
Waddesdon Manor, Buckinghamshire 2: Special (2 February 1997)
Pickering (9 February 1997)
Aberystwyth (16 February 1997)
Saffron Walden (23 February 1997)
Chatsworth House 1 (2 March 1997)
Chatsworth House 2: Special (9 March 1997)
City Hall, Perth (16 March 1997)
Skegness (23 March 1997)
Indoor School, Lord's Cricket Ground (30 March 1997)
Moreton-in-Marsh (6 April 1997)
Scone Palace (Perth) Special (including unseen bits) (13 April 1997) 
Hôtel de Ville (Town Hall), Arras, France (20 April 1997)
Lanhydrock House, Bodmin (27 April 1997)

Series 20 (1997-98)
Series 20: 28 editions from 2 November 1997 – 17 May 1998

Britannia Royal Naval College, Dartmouth (2 November 1997)
Barnsley (9 November 1997)
Woking (16 November 1997)
Walsall Town Hall (23 November 1997)
Marlborough College (30 November 1997)
Claverton Manor (7 December 1997)
Blickling Hall, Norfolk (14 December 1997)
Special: The Next Generation; Techniquest, Cardiff Bay (28 December 1997)
Christ Church College, Oxford (4 January 1998)
RAF Locking (11 January 1998)
Durham (18 January 1998)
West Dean College, Chichester 1 (25 January 1998)
West Dean College, Chichester 2 (1 February 1998)
Altrincham (8 February 1998)
Fort William (15 February 1998)
Newport, Isle of Wight (22 February 1998)
Hull (1 March 1998)
Burghley House 1 (8 March 1998)
Burghley House 2 (15 March 1998)
Porthmadog (22 March 1998)
Reebok Stadium (29 March 1998)
Bishop's Palace, St Davids, Pembrokeshire (5 April 1998)
Minehead railway station (12 April 1998) 
Compilation: Harewood House Special (including unseen bits) (19 April 1998)
Brecon, Powys (26 April 1998)
Canterbury (3 May 1998)
Cannock (10 May 1998)
Dromoland Castle, County Clare (17 May 1998)

Series 21 (1998-99)
Series 21: 25 editions (including 21st anniversary special) from 27 September 1998 – 14 March 1999

Welshpool (27 September 1998)
Stranraer, Dumfries and Galloway (plus archive footage compilation) (4 October 1998)
Coalville (11 October 1998)
Royal Naval College, Greenwich (18 October 1998)
Old Observatory, Greenwich (25 October 1998)
Poole (1 November 1998)
Bletchley (8 November 1998)
Ormskirk (15 November 1998)
Dorking (22 November 1998)
Ickworth House, Suffolk 1 (29 November 1998)
Ickworth House, Suffolk 2 (6 December 1998)
Chapel of Lancing College, Sussex (13 December 1998)
Special: The Next Generation; Heritage Motor Centre, Warwickshire (27 December 1998)
Westonbirt School, Gloucestershire (3 January 1999)
Gateshead (10 January 1999)
Highclere Castle 1, Hampshire (17 January 1999)
Highclere Castle 2, Hampshire 2 (plus unseen bits) (24 January 1999)
Northallerton (31 January 1999)
Carnoustie, Angus (7 February 1999)
Gainsborough, Lincolnshire (14 February 1999)
Syon Park 1 (21 February 1999)
Syon Park 2 (plus unseen bits) (28 February 1999)
Plymouth (7 March 1999)
Lyme Park, Cheshire (14 March 1999)

Series 22 (1999-2000)
Series 22: 26 editions from 31 October 1999 – 21 May 2000

Athelhampton House, Dorset (31 October 1999)
Lowestoft (7 November 1999)
Oldham (14 November 1999)
Clydebank, Glasgow (21 November 1999)
Castle Howard 1 (28 November 1999)
Castle Howard 2 (plus unseen bits) (5 December 1999)
Torquay (12 December 1999)
Worcester Cathedral (19 December 1999)
Eltham Palace (hosted from; with satellite links to four village halls elsewhere in UK) (2 January 2000)
Winchester College 1 (16 January 2000)
Winchester College 2 (plus unseen bits) (23 January 2000)
Morpeth, Northumberland (30 January 2000)
Llanelli (6 February 2000)
Grantham, Lincolnshire (13 February 2000)
Douglas, Isle of Man (20 February 2000)
Castle Ashby 1 (5 March 2000)
Castle Ashby 2 (plus unseen bits) (12 March 2000)
Wrexham (19 March 2000)
Clacton-on-Sea (26 March 2000)
Halifax, West Yorkshire (2 April 2000)
Reading, Berkshire (9 April 2000)
Coleraine (16 April 2000)
Keswick, Cumbria (23 April 2000)
Bowes Museum (7 May 2000)
Penshurst Place 1 (14 May 2000)
Penshurst Place 2 (21 May 2000)

Series 23 (2000-01)
Series 23: 26 editions from 1 October 2000 – 1 April 2001

Victoria and Albert Museum 1 (1 October 2000)
Barnstaple (8 October 2000)
Biddulph (15 October 2000)
Glamis Castle 1 (22 October 2000)
Glamis Castle 2 (29 October 2000)
Selby (5 November 2000)
Wisbech (12 November 2000)
Blackpool (19 November 2000)
Newport, Gwent (26 November 2000)
Knebworth House 1 (3 December 2000)
Knebworth House 2 (includes unseen bits) (10 December 2000)
University of Birmingham (17 December 2000)
Cliveden 1 (7 January 2001)
Cliveden 2 (14 January 2001)
Lochgilphead (21 January 2001)
Salford (28 January 2001)
Eastnor Castle 1 (4 February 2001)
Eastnor Castle 2: Special (includes unseen bits) (11 February 2001)
Eston (18 February 2001)
Melksham (25 February 2001)
Caernarfon (4 March 2001)
Rugby (11 March 2001)
Victoria and Albert Museum 2 (includes unseen bits) (18 March 2001)
Forde Abbey 1 (25 March 2001)
Forde Abbey 2 (1 April 2001)

Series 24 (2001-02)
Series 24: 26 editions from 2 September 2001 – 5 May 2002

Buxton (2 September 2001)
Kettering (9 September 2001)
Hartlepool (16 September 2001)
Hayward's Heath (23 September 2001)
Newmarket 1 (30 September 2001)
Newmarket 2 (7 October 2001)
Bridgend (21 October 2001)
Victoria and Albert Museum 3 (28 October 2001)
Nottingham (4 November 2001)
Mellerstain House 1 (11 November 2001)
Mellerstain House 2 (includes unseen bits) (18 November 2001)
Stroud (25 November 2001)
Carlisle (2 December 2001)
Royal Holloway 1 (9 December 2001)
Royal Holloway 2 (16 December 2001)
Special: The Next Generation; Milestones Museum, Basingstoke (31 December 2001)
National Gallery of Canada, Ottawa, Canada (13 January 2002)
Whitchurch, Shropshire (20 January 2002)
Knightshayes Court 1 (3 February 2002)
Knightshayes Court 2 (includes unseen bits) (24 February 2002)
Witney (3 March 2002)
St Austell (10 March 2002)
Shetland (17 March 2002)
Houghton Hall 1 (31 March 2002)
Houghton Hall 2 (28 April 2002)
Harrogate (5 May 2002)

Series 25 (2002-03)
Series 25: 26 editions from 8 September 2002 – 9 March 2003

St. George's Hall, Liverpool (8 September 2002)
Tenby (15 September 2002)
Tidworth (22 September 2002)
Warwick Castle 1 (29 September 2002)
Warwick Castle 2 (6 October 2002)
Harrogate (13 October 2002)
Royal Yacht Britannia, Edinburgh (includes unseen bits) (20 October 2002)
Chichester Cathedral (27 October 2002)
Shugborough Hall 1 (3 November 2002)
Shugborough Hall 2 (10 November 2002)
Ramsgate (17 November 2002)
Oban (24 November 2002)
Leeds Town Hall (1 December 2002)
Royal Armouries Museum, Leeds (8 December 2002)
Uppingham School, Rutland (15 December 2002)
Mansion House (22 December 2002)
Special: The Next Generation; Imperial War Museum, Cambridgeshire (29 December 2002)
Toronto, Canada (5 January 2003)
Clitheroe (12 January 2003)
Chartwell (19 January 2003)
Sherborne School 1 (2 February 2003)
Sherborne School 2 (9 February 2003)
Dunrobin Castle 1 (16 February 2003)
Dunrobin Castle 2 (includes unseen bits) (23 February 2003)
Renishaw Hall 1 (2 March 2003)
Renishaw Hall 2 (9 March 2003)
Compilation of viewers' favourite clips (16 March 2003)

Series 26 (2003-04)
Series 26: 26 editions from 7 September 2003 – 29 February 2004

Sudeley Castle, near Winchcombe, Gloucestershire (7 September 2003)
Bala (14 September 2003)
Burton-Upon-Trent (21 September 2003)
Redruth (28 September 2003)
National Maritime Museum Special (5 October 2003)
Dumfries (12 October 2003)
Cressing Temple Barns (19 October 2003)
Chichester Cathedral (26 October 2003)
Kendal Castle (2 November 2003)
Dyrham Park 1 (9 November 2003)
Dyrham Park 2 (16 November 2003)
Boston (23 November 2003)
Clitheroe (30 November 2003)
Abergavenny (7 December 2003)
Mount Stewart, County Down 1 (14 December 2003)
Mount Stewart, County Down 2 (21 December 2003)
The Next Generation; (28 December 2003)
Woburn Abbey, Bedfordshire 1 (4 January 2004)
Woburn Abbey, Bedfordshire 2 (11 January 2004)
Scarborough (18 January 2004)
St Ives (25 January 2004)
Royal Hospital Halsar (1 February 2004)
Wigan (8 February 2004)
London to Brighton (15 February 2004)
Royal Horticultural Society Gardens, Wisley 1 (22 February 2004)
Royal Horticultural Society Gardens, Wisley 2 (29 February 2004)

Series 27 (2004-05)
Series 27: 25 editions from 5 September 2004 – 20 March 2005

Portmeirion (5 September 2004)
Haltwhistle (12 September 2004)
Hastings (19 September 2004)
Witley Court (26 September 2004)
Magna Centre (3 October 2004)
Rotherham (10 October 2004)
The National Archives (17 October 2004)
Hampton Court Palace 1 (24 October 2004)
Hampton Court Palace 2 (31 October 2004)
Hornsea (7 November 2004)
Dyrham Park (14 November 2004)
Edinburgh (21 November 2004)
Wilton House (28 November 2004)
City Hall, Cardiff (5 December 2004)
Cardiff Castle (12 December 2004)
King's College, Cambridge 1 (2 January 2005)
King's College, Cambridge 2 (9 January 2005) 
The Next Generation, Birmingham (16 January 2005)
Tyntesfield House (23 January 2005)
Stornoway, Isle of Lewis (30 January 2005)
Victoria Baths, Manchester (6 February 2005)
HMS Victory, Portsmouth (13 February 2005)
The Leisure Centre, Abergavenny (20 February 2005)
Ipswich (27 February 2005)
Dartington Hall 1 (6 March 2005)
Dartington Hall 2 (13 March 2005)
Season's retrospective (20 March 2005)

Series 28 (2005-06)
Series 28: 25 editions from 4 September 2005 – 19 March 2006

Lichfield Cathedral (4 September 2005)
University of Wales, Lampeter (11 September 2005)
Edinburgh (18 September 2005)
Normanby Hall (25 September 2005)
Pannier Market Tavistock (2 October 2005)
Compilation episode (9 October 2005)
Ipswich (16 October 2005)
Beamish Museum (23 October 2005)
Manderston House (30 October 2005)
Rochdale Town Hall (6 November 2005)
Royal Hospital, Chelsea (13 November 2005)
Winter Gardens, Ventnor (20 November 2005)
Compilation episode (27 November 2005)
Lancaster Town Hall (4 December 2005)
Coughton Court 1 (11 December 2005)
Coughton Court 2 (18 December 2005)
Next Generation, British Empireand Commonwealth (28 December 2005)
Sydney (1 January 2006)
Norwich Cathedral 1 (15 January 2006)
Norwich Cathedral 2 (22 January 2006)
Millennium Forum, Derry (12 February 2006)
Compilation episode (19 February 2006)
Montacute House, Somerset 1 (26 February 2006)
Montacute House, Somerset 2 (5 March 2006)
Royal Exhibition Building, Melbourne (12 March 2006)
Season's retrospective (19 March 2006)

Series 29 (2006-07)
Series 29: 31 editions from 3 September 2006 – 29 April 2007

Greatest Finds 1;
Greatest Finds 2;
Greatest Finds 3;
Gloucester Cathedral 1;
Carter's Steam Fair;
Kedleston Hall;
Auckland Castle 1;
Auckland Castle 2;
Swansea Guildhall;
Hughenden Manor;
Hughenden Manor: unseen items;
Aberdeen Music Hall;
Prideaux Place, Padstow 1;
Prideaux Place, Padstow 2;
Baron's Hall Arundel Castle;
Next Generation, Edinburgh;
Gloucester Cathedral 2;
Australia Special: Sydney and Melbourne;
Symphony Hall, Birmingham;
Holkham Hall 1;
Holkham Hall 2;
Southport 1;
Southport 2;
Wakehurst Place, Ardingly;
Kelvingrove Art Gallery and Museum 1;
Kelvingrove Art Gallery and Museum 2;
Tavistock;
Lacock Abbey 1;
Lacock Abbey 2;
Greatest Finds;
Season's retrospective

Series 30 (2007-08)
Series 30: 27 editions from 2 September 2007 – 30 March 2008

The Courtyard Centre for the Arts, Hereford;
Arundel and Alnwick Castle;
Burleigh Pottery, Middleport;
Wills Memorial Building, Bristol;
Coventry Cathedral;
Banqueting House, London 1;
Banqueting House, London 2;
Highcliffe Castle, Christchurch, Dorset;
Compilation episode;
East Kirkby Aviation Centre 1;
East Kirkby Aviation Centre 2;
Exmouth Pavilion, Exmouth;
Powis Castle, near Welshpool, Powys;
Rochester Cathedral, Rochester, Kent 1;
Rochester Cathedral Rochester, Kent 2;
De La Warr Pavilion, Bexhill-on-Sea 1;
Castle of Mey, near Thurso, Scotland;
St. George's Hall, Liverpool 1;
St. George's Hall, Liverpool 2;
Kentwell Hall, Long Melford, Suffolk;
De Montfort Hall, Leicester;
Coronation Hall, Ulverston;
De La Warr Pavilion, Bexhill-on-Sea 2;
Sheffield City Hall;
Sport Relief, Lord's Cricket Ground;
Farewell to Michael Aspel

Series 31 (2008-09)
Series 31: 27 editions from 7 September 2008 – 12 April 2009

Bolton Abbey, near Skipton;
Althorp, near Northampton, Northamptonshire;
Chester Cathedral 1;
Chester Cathedral 2;
Ascot;
Compilation 1;
Lanhydrock near Bodmin;
Southwell Minster 1;
Southwell Minster 2;
Leeds Castle, Maidstone, Kent 1;
Leeds Castle, Maidstone, Kent 2;
The Sage Gateshead;
Bodnant Garden Tal-y-Cafn, near Colwyn Bay;
Compilation 2;
Hertford College, Oxford 1;
Dumfries House, Cumnock;
Bridlington Spa Royal Hall 1;
MS Titanic Drawing Offices, Belfast 1;
MS Titanic Drawing Offices, Belfast 2;
Bishop's Palace, Wells, Somerset 1;
Bishop's Palace, Wells, Somerset 2;
Caird Hall, City Square, Dundee;
Dulwich Picture Gallery 1;
Dulwich Picture Gallery 2;
Bridlington Spa Royal Hall 2;
Oxburgh Hall, near King's Lynn, Norfolk;
Season's retrospective

Series 32 (2009-10)
Series 32: 30 editions from 20 September 2009 – 9 May 2010

Samarès Manor, Jersey;
Blackpool Tower Ballroom 1;
Blackpool Tower Ballroom 2;
Hertford College, Oxford 2;
Morwellham Quay, near Tavistock;
Lincoln Cathedral 1;
Lincoln Cathedral 2;
Bowes Museum, Barnard Castle;
Bletchley Park 1;
Bletchley Park 2;
Burghley House, Stamford;
Abbotsford House, Melrose;
Saumarez Park, Guernsey;
Brooklands Museum, Weybridge 1;
Brooklands Museum, Weybridge 2;
Aberglasney Gardens, Carmarthenshire;
Bath Assembly Rooms 1;
Bath Assembly Rooms 2;
Blists Hill Victorian Town, Ironbridge;
Leeds Town Hall 1;
Leeds Town Hall 2;
Somerleyton Hall, Lowestoft 1;
Hopetoun House, South Queensferry, West Lothian 1;
Stanway House, Gloucestershire;
Compilation episode;
Burghley House, Stamford;
Abbotsford House, Melrose;
Hopetoun House, West Lothian;
Old Royal Naval College, Greenwich 1;
Old Royal Naval College, Greenwich 2

Series 33 (2010-11)
Series 33: 29 editions from 19 September 2010 – 17 July 2011

Beverley Minster 1;
Beverley Minster 2;
Somerleyton Hall, Lowestoft 2;
STEAM – Museum of the Great Western Railway, Swindon 1;
Brighton College 1;
Brighton College 2;
Hopetoun House, South Queensferry, West Lothian 2;
British Museum 1;
Tatton Park, Knutsford 1;
Tatton Park, Knutsford 2;
Hatfield House 1;
Chatsworth House, Derbyshire 1;
Chatsworth House, Derbyshire 2;
Blair Castle, near Pitlochry 1;
Hampton Court Castle, Leominster, Herefordshire 1;
Britannia Royal Naval College, Dartmouth 1;
Britannia Royal Naval College, Dartmouth 2;
Victoria Hall, Saltaire 1;
Victoria Hall, Saltaire 2;
St Fagans National History Museum, near Cardiff;
British Museum 2;
STEAM – Museum of the Great Western Railway, Swindon 2;
Hatfield House 2;
Winchester Cathedral 1;
Winchester Cathedral 2;
Hutton-in-the-Forest, near Penrith, Cumbria;
Hampton Court Castle, Leominster, Herefordshire 2;
Season's retrospective;
Compilation episode

Series 34 (2011-12)
Series 34: 27 editions from 18 September 2011 – 8 July 2012

Manchester Town Hall 1;
Charlecote Park, Stratford-upon-Avon 1;
Lulworth Castle, Dorset 1;
Blair Castle, near Pitlochry 2;
Hever Castle, Kent 1;
Hever Castle, Kent 2;
Birmingham University 1;
Aberystwyth University 1;
Remembrance Special, Staffordshire;
Seaton Delaval 1;
Castle Coole, near Enniskillen 1;
Layer Marney Tower, near Colchester, Essex 1;
Layer Marney Tower, near Colchester, Essex 2;
Christmas Retrospective 2011;
Hartland Abbey, Devon 1;
Hartland Abbey, Devon 2;
Saint Andrews University 1;
Lulworth Castle, Dorset 2;
Weald and Downland Museum, Sussex 1;
Yorkshire Museum, York 1;
Yorkshire Museum, York 2;
Wimbledon 1;
Wimbledon 2;
Manchester Town Hall 2;
Seaton Delaval 2;
Birmingham University 2;
Weald and Downland Museum, Sussex 2

Series 35 (2012-13)
Series 35: 25 editions from 7 October 2012 – 23 June 2013

RAF Marham, Norfolk 1;
Port Sunlight 1;
Port Sunlight 2;
St Andrews University 2;
Scarborough, Grand Spa Hall 1;
Farnborough 1;
Falmouth National Maritime Museum, Cornwall 1;
Falmouth National Maritime Museum, Cornwall 2;
Aberystwyth University 2;
Wightwick Manor, near Wolverhampton 1;
2012 Christmas Special;
Fountains Abbey 1;
Stowe House 1;
Cawdor Castle, near Inverness;
Chatham Historic Dockyard 1;
Chatham Historic Dockyard 2;
Newstead Abbey 1;
Cheltenham Town Hall 1;
Cheltenham Town Hall 2;
Castle Coole, near Enniskillen 2;
Farnborough 2;
Chepstow Racecourse 1;
Stowe House 2;
Scarborough, Grand Spa Hall 2;
RAF Marham, Norfolk 2

Series 36 (2013-14)
Series 36: 26 editions from 18 August 2013 – 20 July 2014

Polesden Lacey 1 (18 August 2013)
Wightwick Manor, near Wolverhampton 2 (25 August 2013)
Eastbourne Bandstand 1 (1 September 2013)
Eastbourne Bandstand 2 (8 September 2013)
Fountains Abbey 2 (15 September 2013)
Royal Marines Museum, Southsea 1 (22 September 2013)
Royal Agricultural University, Cirencester 1 (29 September 2013)
Newstead Abbey 2 (6 October 2013)
Towneley Hall 1 (13 October 2013)
The Scottish Gallery of Modern Art 1 (22 December 2013)
Retrospective (29 December 2013; shown in Scotland on 16 February 2014)
The Royal Ballet School, Richmond 1 (5 January 2014)
Sainsbury Centre, Norwich 1 (12 January 2014)
Exeter Cathedral 1 (23 March 2014)
Scone Palace 1 (30 March 2014)
World War I Special 1: filmed at the Thiepval Memorial to the Missing of the Somme (6 April 2014)
Royal Agricultural University, Cirencester 2 (13 April 2014)
Polesden Lacey 2 (20 April 2014)
Gregynog (27 April 2014)
Royal Marines Museum, Eastney, Portsmouth 2 (4 May 2014)
Exeter Cathedral 2 (11 May 2014)
The Scottish Gallery of Modern Art 2 (25 May 2014)
The Royal Ballet School, Richmond 2 (1 June 2014)
Sainsbury Centre, Norwich 2 (22 June 2014)
Wentworth Woodhouse 1 (29 June 2014)
Wentworth Woodhouse 2 (20 July 2014)

Series 37 (2014-15)
Series 37: 27 editions from 14 September 2014 – 28 June 2015

Hillsborough Castle 1 (14 September 2014)
Kirby Hall 1 (21 September 2014)
Kirby Hall 2 (28 September 2014)
Scone Palace 2 (5 October 2014)
Derby Roundhouse (12 October 2014)
Chenies Manor 1 (19 October 2014)
Chenies Manor 2 (26 October 2014)
World War I Special 2: filmed at Somme battlefields (2 November 2014)
Tredegar House 1 (23 November 2014)
Towneley Hall 2 (30 November 2014)
Walthamstow Town Hall 1 (7 December 2014)
Christmas Special: filmed at Tredegar House (21 December 2014)
Durham Cathedral 1 (28 December 2014; not shown in Scotland until 6 January 2015 BBC2 repeat)
Walthamstow Town Hall 2 (11 January 2015)
Liverpool Metropolitan Cathedral 1 (22 March 2015)
Liverpool Metropolitan Cathedral 2 (29 March 2015)
Belton House 1 (5 April 2015)
Belton House 2 (12 April 2015)
Lowther Castle 1 (19 April 2015)
Lowther Castle 2 (26 April 2015)
Kelvingrove Art Gallery and Museum 1 (3 May 2015)
Barrington Court 1 (17 May 2015)
Barrington Court 2 (24 May 2015)
Ashton Court 1 (31 May 2015)
The Scottish Gallery of Modern Art 3 (14 June 2015)
Tredegar House 2 (21 June 2015)
Ashton Court/Hillsborough Castle 2 (28 June 2015)

Series 38 (2015-16)
Series 38: 25 editions from 6 September 2015 – 15 May 2016

Plas Newydd 1 (6 September 2015)
RAF Coningsby 1 (20 September 2015)
Broughton Castle 1 (27 September 2015)
Durham Cathedral 2 (4 October 2015)
The Royal William Yard 1 (11 October 2015)
The Royal William Yard 2 (18 October 2015)
Bolsover Castle 1 (25 October 2015)
Bolsover Castle 2 (1 November 2015)
RAF Coningsby 2 (8 November 2015)
Walmer Castle 1 (15 November 2015)
Walmer Castle 2 (22 November 2015)
Plas Newydd 2 (29 November 2015)
Balmoral 1 (6 December 2015)
Balmoral 2 (13 December 2015)
Christmas Special: Lyme Park 1 (30 December 2015)
Bowood House 1 (3 January 2016)
Bowood House 2 (10 January 2016)
India Special (13 March 2016)
The Royal Hall Harrogate 1 (27 March 2016)
The Royal Hall Harrogate 2 (3 April 2016)
Kelvingrove Art Gallery and Museum 2 (10 April 2016)
Hanbury Hall 1 (17 April 2016)
Trentham Gardens 1 (24 April 2016; shown on BBC2 in Northern Ireland)
Lyme Park 2 (1 May 2016)
Trentham Gardens 2 (15 May 2016)

Series 39 (2016-17)
Series 39: 24 editions from 28 August 2016 – 2 July 2017

Tewkesbury Abbey 1 (28 August 2016)
Audley End 1 (4 September 2016)
Audley End 2 (11 September 2016)
Hanbury Hall 2 (18 September 2016)
Arley Hall 1 (25 September 2016)
Arley Hall 2 (2 October 2016)
Broughton Castle 2 (9 October 2016)
Baddesley Clinton 1 (16 October 2016)
Baddesley Clinton 2 (23 October 2016)
Tewkesbury Abbey 2 (8 January 2017)
Burton Constable 2 (19 March 2017; shown on BBC Two in Northern Ireland)
Burton Constable 1 (26 March 2017; shown on BBC Two in Northern Ireland)
BBC Caversham Park 1 (2 April 2017)
Pembroke Castle 1 (9 April 2017)
Pembroke Castle 2 (16 April 2017)
Senate House 1 (23 April 2017)
Trelissick 1 (30 April 2017)
Ightham Mote 1 (7 May 2017)
Ightham Mote 2 (21 May 2017; shown in Scotland on 16 July 2017)
New Lanark 1 (28 May 2017)
New Lanark 2 (11 June 2017)
BBC Caversham 2 (18 June 2017)
Holker Hall 1 (25 June 2017)
Unscreened Gems (2 July 2017)

Series 40 (2017-19)
Series 40: 27 editions from 24 September 2017 – 26 May 2019

Castle Howard 1 (24 September 2017)
Minehead Railway Station 1 (1 October 2017)
Nymans 1 (8 October 2017)
Nymans 2 (15 October 2017)
Senate House 2 (22 October 2017)
Entertainment Special (from the EastEnders set) (31 December 2017)
Black Country Living Museum 1 (15 April 2018)
Castle Howard 2 (22 April 2018)
Floors Castle 1 (29 April 2018)
Helmingham Hall 1 (6 May 2018)
Black Country Living Museum 2 (20 May 2018)
Coronation Special (from Royal Yacht Britannia in Edinburgh) (28 May 2018)
Helmingham Hall 2 (3 June 2018)
Newcastle Civic Centre 1 (17 June 2018)
Osbourne House 1 (24 June 2018)
Floors Castle 2 (1 July 2018)
Cardiff Castle 1 (8 July 2018)
Minehead Railway Station 2 (15 July 2018)
Cardiff Castle 2 (22 July 2018)
Stormont Parliament Buildings and Estate 1 (29 July 2018)
Trelissick 2 (5 August 2018)
Helmingham Hall 3 (19 August 2018)
Abbey Pumping Station 1 (16 September 2018)
Stormont Parliament Buildings and Estate 2 (23 September 2018)
Abbey Pumping Station 2 (30 September 2018)
Newcastle Civic Centre 2 (5 May 2019)
Osbourne House 2 (26 May 2019)

Series 41 (2019)
Series 41: 19 editions from 6 January 2019 – 16 June 2019

Eltham Palace 1 (6 January 2019)
Erddig 1 (13 January 2019)
Crathes Castle 2 (20 January 2019)
Cromer Pier 2 (3 February 2019)
Buckfast Abbey 1 (10 February 2019)
Aerospace Bristol 1 (24 February 2019)
Piece Hall 1 (3 March 2019)
Wrest Park 1 (10 March 2019)
MediaCityUK 1 (17 March 2019)
Eltham Palace 2 (24 March 2019)
Crathes Castle 1 (31 March 2019)
Aerospace Bristol 2 (7 April 2019)
Erddig 2 (14 April 2019; not shown in Northern Ireland)
Buckfast Abbey 2 (21 April 2019)
Piece Hall 2 (28 April 2019)
Wrest Park 2 (19 May 2019)
MediaCityUK 2 (2 June 2019)
Cromer Pier 1 (9 June 2019)
Eltham Palace 3 (16 June 2019)

Series 42 (2019-20)
Series 42: 17 editions from 1 September 2019 – 14 May 2020

Morden Hall Park 1 (1 September 2019)
Salisbury Cathedral 1 (15 September 2019)
V&A Dundee 1 (22 September 2019)
Lytham Hall 1 (29 September 2019)
Compton Verney 1 (6 October 2019)
Morden Hall Park 3 (13 October 2019)
Battle Abbey 2 (20 October 2019)
Castle Ward 1 (27 October 2019)
Battle Abbey 1 (1 March 2020)
Salisbury Cathedral 2 (8 March 2020)
V&A Dundee 2 (15 March 2020)
National Botanic Garden of Wales 1 (22 March 2020)
Morden Hall Park 2 (29 March 2020)
Lytham Hall 2 (5 April 2020)
Compton Verney 2 (12 April 2020)
Castle Ward 2 (26 April 2020)
National Botanic Garden of Wales 2 (3 May 2020)

Series 43 (2021)
Series 43: 16 editions from 3 January 2021 - 18 July 2021

Forty Hall 1 (3 January 2021)
Christchurch Mansion 1 (17 January 2021)
Newby Hall 1 (31 January 2021)
Culzean Castle 1 (7 February 2021)
Bodnant Garden 1 (14 February 2021)
Windermere Jetty 1 (21 February 2021)
Stonor Park 1 (28 February 2021)
Kenilworth Castle 1 (7 March 2021)
Forty Hall 2 (14 March 2021)
Christchurch Mansion 2 (28 March 2021)
Culzean Castle 2 (4 April 2021)
Newby Hall 2 (18 April 2021)
Bodnant Garden 2 (25 April 2021)
Windermere Jetty 2 (9 May 2021; 12 May 2021 in Scotland)
Stonor Park 2 (16 May 2021)
Forty Hall 3 (23 May 2021)
Kenilworth Castle 2 (18 July 2021)

Series 44 (2021-22)
Series 44: 19 editions from 12 September 2021 - 28 August 2022

Ham House 1 (12 September 2021)
Dyffryn Gardens 1 (19 September 2021)
Royal Botanic Garden Edinburgh 1 (26 September 2021)
Aston Hall 1 (7 November 2021)
Portchester 2 (13 February 2022; shown on BBC2 in Northern Ireland)
Ulster Folk Museum 1 (20 February 2022)
Woodhorn Museum 1 (27 February 2022)
Ham House 2 (6 March 2022)
Bishop's Palace, Wells 1 (27 March 2022)
Royal Botanic Garden Edinburgh 3 (3 April 2022)
Aston Hall 2 (10 April 2022)
Dyffryn Gardens 2 (24 April 2022)
Ulster Folk Museum 2 (1 May 2022)
Woodhorn Museum 2 (8 May 2022)
Portchester 1 (15 May 2022)
Royal Botanic Garden Edinburgh 2 (22 May 2022)
Bishop's Palace 2 (14 August 2022)
Ham House 3 (21 August 2022)
Ulster Folk Museum 3 (28 August 2022)

Series 45 (2022-23)
Series 45: 4 September 2022

Wollaton Hall 1 (4 September 2022)
Sefton Park Palm House 1 (25 September 2022)
Brodie Castle & Estate, Morayshire 1 (2 October 2022)
Clissold Park 1 (9 October 2022)
Brodie Castle & Estate, Morayshire 2 (16 October 2022)
Wollaton Hall 2 (30 October 2022)
Eden Project 1 (5 March 2023)
Belmont House 1 (12 March 2023)
Clissold Park 3 (19 March 2023)
Sefton Park Palm House 2 (26 March 2023)

Specials

 Antiques Roadshow: The First Ten Years (20 December 1987)
 Antiques Roadshow: Going Live! (26 December 1991)
 Antiques Roadshow: The Next Generation (12 editions, broadcast 1 January 1992 – 29 December 2006)
 Antiques Roadshow: Fifteen Priceless Years (28 March 1993)
 Antiques Roadshow: Junior Roadshow (13 August 1993)
 Antiques Roadshow: Priceless Gems (6 editions, broadcast 1 October 1996 – 11 April 2001)
 Antiques Roadshow: Unwrapped – 21st Anniversary (20 December 1998) - Jill Dando introduces a special edition to celebrate the programme's 21st anniversary
 Antiques Roadshow: 25 Years On! (1 September 2002)
 Antiques Roadshow: Greatest Finds (3 editions, broadcast 3 – 17 September 2006)
 Antiques Roadshow: Farewell To Michael Aspel (30 March 2008)
 Priceless Antiques Roadshow Series 1 (15 editions, broadcast 9 – 27 March 2009)
 Priceless Antiques Roadshow Series 2 (20 editions, broadcast 1 – 26 February 2010)
 Restoration Roadshow (20 editions, broadcast 9 August – 3 September 2010; presented by Eric Knowles)
 Shakespeare Special (29 April 2012)
 Diamond Jubilee Special (10 June 2012)
 Antiques Roadshow Detectives (15 editions, broadcast 6 – 24 April 2015) - a series of programmes looking at some of the stories behind featured objects in more detail
 Balmoral Royal Special (30 September 2015)
 Golden Age of Travel Special (30 October 2016) - a look at items from the golden age of rail, air and sea including the world's most famous steam locomotive 60103 Flying Scotsman
 Highlights of 2016 (28 December 2016)
 Holocaust Memorial (15 January 2017)
 Pioneering Women Special (10 June 2018)
 World War I Special (4 November 2018)
 Compilation 1 (31 December 2018)
 Compilation 2 (23 June 2019)
 Second World War Special (8 September 2019)
 What Happened Next (29 December 2019)
 VE Day Special (10 May 2020)
 The Best of the Summer (6 September 2020)
 The Battle of Britain and the Blitz (13 September 2020)
 The Best of the Summer, part 2 (27 September 2020)
 The Best of the Summer, part 3 (18 October 2020)
 What Happened Next (27 December 2020)
 World War II – The Aftermath (2 May 2021)
 Christmas Special (19 December 2021)
 100 Years of the BBC (23 October 2022)
 Toys & Childhood Special (29 December 2022) - a look at the best-loved toys of the past 100 years, featuring Jonathan Ross and shot at Museum of the Home in Hoxton

 Nursing Special (26 February 2023)

References

Each programme's details are contained in the official BBC online database for the series (from series 18).

External links
 Official Website – BBC Antiques Roadshow
 Antiques Roadshow
 Episode list (up to and including series 31) – TV.com
 Filming Dates – BBC Homes and Antiques
 BBC Restoration Roadshow

 
Lists of British non-fiction television series episodes